= French and Russian in Imperial Russia =

Non fiction Russian book series published in 2015

- First editions
- Editor: Derek Offord; Lara Ryazanova-Clarke; Vladislav Rjéoutski; Gesine Argent
- Language: English
- Subject: Language usage in the Russian Empire
- Genre: Non-fiction
- Publisher: Edinburgh University Press
- Publication date: 2015
- Publication place: United Kingdom

French and Russian in Imperial Russia is a two-volume non-fiction series published in 2015 by Edinburgh University Press. The volumes were edited by Derek Offord, Lara Ryazanova-Clarke, Vladislav Rjéoutski, and Gesine Argent. The two volumes are about language usage in the Russian Empire.
